Elks of Canada is a fraternal organization that was founded in 1912.  It is not directly affiliated with Benevolent and Protective Order of Elks, the American organization founded in 1868, but the two "share a common history and enjoy a friendly relationship".

Early history

The organization was founded in Vancouver, British Columbia by three men from Seattle. It appeared that they were only in it for the money, but early applicants were able to seize control of the organization and begin building it in earnest. The first Grand Exalted Ruler of the Grand Lodge of Canada was Charles Edward Redeker, from Windsor, Ontario.

In 1979 it had 300,000 members.
In 2018 "The Elks of Canada consist of nearly 300 Lodges with 11,000 members located in almost every province and territory"

In popular culture
Winnipeg-based indie rock group The Weakerthans have a song entitled "Psalm for the Elks Lodge Last Call".

See also
Order of Royal Purple, the Elks of Canada former auxiliary group 
Improved Benevolent and Protective Order of Elks of the World

References

External links
Elks of Canada

Clubs and societies in Canada
Organizations established in 1912
Benevolent and Protective Order of Elks
1912 establishments in Canada